is a village in Aomori Prefecture, Japan. , the village had an estimated population of 9,845 in 4988 households, and a population density of 40 persons per km².

Geography
Rokkasho occupies the eastern coastline of the base of Shimokita Peninsula, facing the Pacific Ocean to the east. The village forms the northern shoreline of Lake Ogawara.

Neighbouring municipalities 
Aomori Prefecture
Misawa
Shimokita District
Higashidōri
Kamikita District
Yokohama
Noheji
Tōhoku

Climate
The village has a cold maritime climate characterized by cool short summers and long cold winters with heavy snowfall (Köppen climate classification Cfa).  The average annual temperature in Rokkasho is 9.6 °C. The average annual rainfall is 1213 mm with September as the wettest month. The temperatures are highest on average in August, at around 22.4 °C, and lowest in January, at around -2.0 °C.

Demographics
Per Japanese census data, the population of Rokkasho has remained relatively stable over the past 70 years.

History
The area around Rokkasho was known for raising horses during the Kamakura period. During the Edo period, it was controlled by the Nanbu clan of Morioka Domain, becoming part of the territories of Shichinohe Domain in the latter half of the Edo period. With the establishment of the modern municipalities system after the start of the Meiji period, on April 1, 1889, the village of Rokkasho was created following the merger of six small hamlets.

Government
Rokkasho has a mayor-council form of government with a directly elected mayor and a unicameral village council of 18 members. Rokkasho is part of Kamikita District which contributes four members to the Aomori Prefectural Assembly. In terms of national politics, the town is part of Aomori 2nd district of the lower house of the Diet of Japan.

Education
Rokkasho has four public elementary schools and three public middle schools operated by the village government and one public high school operated by the Aomori Prefectural Board of Education.

Economy
The economy of Rokkasho has traditionally been dependent on agriculture and commercial fishing. From the 1980s onwards, the village has become a center for various energy developments, which now dominate the local economy. Rokkasho's per capita income was $129,676 (1557,8000 Yen $1= 120.13 Yen )

Nuclear industry & Research 
Nuclear fuel cycle related facilities:

 Japan Nuclear Fuel Limited headquarters
 The Rokkasho Reprocessing Plant (currently under test operation)
 A uranium enrichment plant and plutonium reprocessing plant.
 A MOX fuel fabrication facility with an 800-ton per year capacity when completed
 A low level nuclear waste storage facility
 A high level nuclear waste temporary storage and monitoring facility

The Japan Atomic Energy Agency also has multiple facilities at the site like the Linear IFMIF Prototype Accelerator (LIPAc) devoted to the Fusion Energy Development Programme under the European Union-Japan Broader Approach agreement.

Since the 1970s, local opposition to plans to operate Japan's first large commercial plutonium plant at Rokkasho have focused on the threat of a large-scale release of radioactivity. During the 1990s anti-nuclear groups in Japan released studies showing the risks of routine operation of the Rokkasho Reprocessing Plant. The facility in full operation is designed to separate as much as 8 tons of plutonium each year from spent reactor fuel from Japan's domestic nuclear reactors. As of 2006 Japan owned approximately 45 tons of separated plutonium.

In May, 2006, an international awareness campaign about the dangers of the Rokkasho reprocessing plant, Stop Rokkasho, was launched by musician Ryuichi Sakamoto. Greenpeace has opposed operation of the Rokkasho Reprocessing Plant under a campaign called "Wings of Peace: No more Hiroshima, Nagasaki. Stop Rokkasho", since 2002 and has launched a cyberaction to stop the project.

Rokkasho was a candidate to host the plasma fusion reactor ITER, but lost out to Cadarache, France. Rokkasho has been hosting the Helios high-performance supercomputer centre capable of performing complex plasma physics calculations for fusion research, since January 2012.

Gas and wind power
 Mutsu-Ogawara Oil Storage Facility 
 Completed: September 1985
 Max capacity: around 5,700 megaliters in 51 tanks
 Current usage: 4,920 megaliters at end of March 2003
 Managing company：Mutsu-Ogawara Oil Storage Co Ltd
Mutsu-Ogawara Wind Farm
Established: January 2003
 Power: 31,500 kW (1,500 kW × 21 units)
 Managing company: Eco power
 Rokkashomura Futamata Wind Power Plant 
 Established: December 2003
 Power: 31,850 kW (1,500 kW × 20 units; 1,425 KW x 2 units)
 Managing company: Japan Wind Development Company Ltd
 Rokkashomura Wind Power Plant
 Established: May 2007
 Power: 51,000 kW (1,500 kW × 34 units)
 Managing company: Japan Wind Development Company Ltd
 Battery energy storage facility
 34 MW (204 MWh) grid energy storage facility using sodium–sulfur batteries, manufactured by NGK, installed since 2008

Agriculture
Stock raising is prevalent.

Fishing
Three small fishing ports.

Transportation

Railway
Rokkasho is not served by any passenger train service. The closest train station is either Noheji Station or Otomo Station on the Aomori Railway or Fukikoshi Station on the Ominato Line

Highway
  Shimokita Expressway

International relations
 Waren, Mecklenburg-Vorpommern, Germany Sister city since 1994.

Local attractions
Rokkasho Prefectural History Museum

In popular media
A documentary, Rokkasho Rhapsody, came out in 2006, which portrays the Rokkasho community's views on the nuclear reprocessing plant.

References

External links

Official Website 

 
Populated coastal places in Japan
Radioactive waste repositories
Villages in Aomori Prefecture